The 2015–16 season was the 52nd season in the existence of Bilbao Athletic and the club's first season back in the second division of Spanish football since the 1995–96 campaign 20 years earlier. During this season, Bilbao Athletic participated in the Segunda División, and also entered the season's edition of the invitational Premier League International Cup for age-restricted teams.

Players

First-team squad

Transfers

In

Out

Pre-season and friendlies

Competitions

Overall record

Segunda División

League table

Results summary

Results by round

Matches
The league fixtures were announced on 14 July 2015.

References

Athletic Bilbao seasons
Bilbao Athletic